USS Dubuque (LPD-8) is an  of the United States Navy.

USS Dubuque is the second ship named after Dubuque, Iowa on the Mississippi River and her founder, Julien Dubuque - a French Canadian explorer. USS Dubuque was commissioned on 1 September 1967 at Norfolk Naval Shipyard in Portsmouth, Virginia.

History
Dubuques keel was laid down on 25 January 1965 by Ingalls Shipbuilding in Pascagoula, Mississippi. She was launched on 6 August 1966 and commissioned on 1 September 1967 at Norfolk Naval Shipyard in Portsmouth, Virginia. In November 1967, the ship arrived at her first homeport of San Diego, California after transiting the Panama Canal.

From 1968 until 1975, Dubuque made five Western Pacific deployments that saw extensive duty in Vietnam. In a highly publicized event in October 1968, the ship returned 14 repatriated prisoners of war (POWs) to North Vietnam. From 1969 until 1971 the ship conducted ten Operation Keystone Cardinal troop lifts to Okinawa as part of the withdrawal of US forces. Dubuque relieved  as the launch platform for HMA-369's Marine Hunter-Killer (MARHUK) Operations near Hon La (Tiger Island) off the coast of North Vietnam. From February to June 1973 the ship operated helicopters that conducted naval mine clearance operations in Haiphong Harbor as part of Operation End Sweep. In April 1975 the ship participated in Operation Frequent Wind, the evacuation of Saigon and the rescue of refugees fleeing South Vietnam.

On 15 August 1985 Dubuque departed San Diego for her new homeport of Sasebo, Japan, where she arrived 4 September 1985. There, she joined the Seventh Fleet Overseas Family Residency Program, her primary mission to support the Marine Corps in the Western Pacific.

In May 1988 Dubuque deployed to the Persian Gulf and served as the control ship for mine sweeping operations to protect US-flagged tankers during the Iran–Iraq War. For her participation in this operation, the ship was awarded the Meritorious Unit Commendation. In 1989 the ship participated in the contingency operation to evacuate American personnel from the Philippines during a failed coup attempt.

Immediately following the Iraqi invasion of Kuwait in August 1990, Dubuque was deployed to the Persian Gulf as part of Operation Desert Shield. The ship functioned as the leading element of Amphibious Ready Group Bravo, which transported Marine Regimental Landing Team Four to Al Jubayl, Saudi Arabia during the critical early stages of the multi-national buildup.

In November 1998 Dubuque again deployed to the Persian Gulf as part of the  Amphibious Ready Group (ARG) on support of Operation Desert Fox.

Since then, she has been once again home-ported in San Diego, California.

From June to September 1999, Dubuque participated in the first SHIP-SWAP with her sister ship Juneau, where each ship's crew remained in their original home ports, allowing Dubuque to return to the homeport of San Diego.

Dubuque also assisted in the protection and maintenance of oil platforms in the northern part of the Persian Gulf.

Dubuque deployed again in 2008 with the  Expeditionary Strike Group. Her crew participated in the pursuit of identifying pirates and collecting intelligence on piracy off the Gulf of Oman and the Horn of Africa. She also participated in rescuing six mariners from a sinking vessel off the Philippine coastline on the way to the Persian Gulf. 

In early May 2009 Dubuque had to abort a humanitarian aid mission to the South Pacific after a sailor on board developed swine flu. It was later found out that approximately 50 cases were likely also H1N1 (swine flu).

The pirates had taken control of the ship the previous day. The Marines captured nine pirates and rescued eleven crew members who had taken refuge in a "safe room" on the ship. No shots were fired and no injuries were reported.

USS Dubuque was officially decommissioned on 30 June 2011.

Swine flu outbreak
In May 2009 the Navy announced that a sailor on the ship had been confirmed as infected with Influenza A virus subtype H1N1 during the worldwide 2009 swine flu pandemic. Fifty more of the ship's sailors were suspected to have also been infected.  As a result, the ship's June 2009 deployment to Oceania in support of the Pacific Partnership program was canceled.

Awards

According to the Navy Awards website , Dubuque has received one Navy Unit Commendation, four Meritorious Unit Commendations, three Battle Efficiency Awards, three Armed Forces Expeditionary Medals, three Humanitarian Service Medals and participated in countless amphibious exercises and operations throughout the Western Pacific and Indian Oceans.

Notes

External links

USS Dubuque official website

navsource.org: USS Dubuque
navysite.de: USS Dubuque
on Bolinao 52

 

Austin-class amphibious transport docks
Cold War amphibious warfare vessels of the United States
Dubuque, Iowa
Vietnam War amphibious warfare vessels of the United States
Ships built in Pascagoula, Mississippi
1966 ships